Pál "Palkó" Dárdai (born 24 April 1999) is a professional footballer who plays as a midfielder for Nemzeti Bajnokság I club Fehérvár. Born in Germany, he plays for the Hungary national team.

Club career

Youth
Dárdai began his youth career at Seeburger SV in 2006, before moving to 1. FC Wilmersdorf in 2009. In 2011, Dárdai moved to the youth academy of Hertha BSC, following his father's retirement from football after 14 years with Hertha.

Hertha BSC
Dárdai made his debut for Hertha BSC II on 18 March 2017, starting in an away match against Carl Zeiss Jena in the Regionalliga Nordost. Dárdai scored to put Hertha 2–1 ahead, before being substituted out with the match finishing as a 2–2 draw.

On 2 November 2017, Dárdai made his professional debut for Hertha BSC under his father in the UEFA Europa League, coming on as a substitute in the 79th minute for Alexander Esswein in the 2–0 home win against Ukrainian club Zorya Luhansk.

Fehérvár FC
On 5 January 2021, Dárdai signed with Fehérvár FC of the Nemzeti Bajnokság I.

International career
Dárdai was a youth international for Germany, but when he transferred to Fehérvár he declared that from then on he wants to represent Hungary. He was included in the Hungarian squad for the 2021 European U-21 championship but was cut due to an injury.

On 13 November 2022 Dárdai was called up to the Hungarian national team for the friendly games against Luxembourg and Greece and gained his first cap on the latter game as a substitute in the 72nd minute.

Personal life
Palkó is the oldest son of Hungarian manager and former footballer Pál Dárdai, and the brother of Hertha BSC footballer Márton Dárdai. Palkó's grandfather was also a footballer and manager, and also named Pál Dárdai.

Career statistics

1.Includes UEFA Europa League.

References

External links
 

1999 births
Living people
Footballers from Berlin
Citizens of Hungary through descent
Hungarian footballers
Hungary international footballers
German footballers
Germany youth international footballers
German people of Hungarian descent
Association football midfielders
Hertha BSC II players
Hertha BSC players
Fehérvár FC players
Bundesliga players
Regionalliga players
Nemzeti Bajnokság I players